Palestinian territories generally refers to the claimed territory of the State of Palestine, the West Bank and Gaza Strip combined.

Palestinian territories may also refer to territories or areas associated with region of Palestine, between the Mediterranean Sea and Jordan River, including:

Administrative divisions of the Oslo Accords, Areas A and B of the West Bank and Gaza Strip
Arab Palestine Territories, areas assigned to Arab Palestine by the United Nations Partition Plan for Palestine in 1947